The Magufuli Cabinet was formed by President of Tanzania John Magufuli after taking the oath of office on 5 November 2015. Magufuli won the 2015 general election with 58% of the vote in a tightly contested race against ex-CCM Chadema rival Edward Lowassa. After being sworn in on 5 November 2015, Magufuli announced his cabinet almost a month later, on 10 December 2015. He reduced the cabinet to 19 ministers from 30 in the previous cabinet. The Second Cabinet's tenure was cut short on 19 March 2021, following the death of President John Magufuli, and the swearing-in of Samia Suluhu Hassan as the new president.

First Term

Inaugural Cabinet
Magufuli's running mate during the 2015 general election was Samia Suluhu; his victory secured Tanzania's first female Vice President of Tanzania. His next appointment was Kassim Majaliwa for the post of Prime Minister.

Changes 
 Charles Kitwanga was replaced on 21 May 2016 as the minister of home affairs after he attended a parliamentary session under the influence of alcohol. 
 Nape Nnauye was relieved of his duty on 23 March 2017 from the post of Minister of Information, Culture, Artists and Sports. Harrison Mwakyembe the Minister of Justice and constitutional affairs at the time took his position and was replaced by Palamagamba John Aidan Mwaluko Kabudi. 
 Sospeter Muhongo was suspended on 24 May 2017 as the Minister of Energy and Minerals after he was implicated in the mineral saga report. His position remained vacant until the first cabinet reshuffle of October 2017.

Cabinet Reshuffle
Magufuli conducts his first major reshuffle on 7 October 2017 increasing the number of ministries from 19 to 21. The biggest change was the splitting of the Ministry of Energy and Minerals into two separate ministries. Furthermore, the Ministry of Agriculture, Livestock & Fisheries was split into two, one being the Ministry of Agriculture and the other being the Ministry of Livestock & Fisheries.

Changes 
 George Masaju was promoted to a Judge at the High Court of Tanzania and the Adelardus Kilangi was appointed as the new Attorney General on February 1, 2020.
 Mwigulu Nchemba was replaced by Alphaxard Kangi Lugola as the minister of home affairs on 30 June 2018.
 Charles Mwijage was replaced by Joseph Kakunda as the minister of industry, trade and investment on 10 November 2018 by the president following a national cashew nut price saga.
 Charles Tizeba was replaced by Japhet Hasunga as the minister of Agriculture on 10 November 2018 following a national cashew nut price saga.
 Angellah Kairuki was appointed to a new position under the Minister of State in the President’s Office for investments, Doto Biteko took over as the new Minister of Minerals on January 9, 2019.
 Augustine Mahiga the Minister of Foreign Affairs and Palamagamba Kabudi the Minister of Justice had their appoints switched on March 3, 2019
 Joseph Kakunda was replaced by Innocent Bashungwa as the minister of Industry, Trade and Investment on June 8, 2019. 
 January Makamba was replaced by George Simbachawene as the new Minister of State in the Vice President's Office on 21 July 2019.
 Alphaxard Lugola was replaced by George Simbachawene as the Minister of Home affairs and Mussa Zungu replaced Simbachawene as the Minister of State in the Vice President's Office on January 23, 2020.
 Mwigulu Nchemba was reinstated into the cabinet as the Ministry of Constitutional and Legal Affairs following the death of Augustine Mahiga on May 2, 2020.

Second Term
Following Magufuli's reelection in the 2020 Tanzanian general election, Magufuli unveiled his new cabinet on December 5th 2020. In total, the cabinet includes a docket of 23 ministers, up 1 from his previous cabinet. The ministry of Works, Transport and Communications was broken out into two, The Ministry of Works & Transport and the other being the Ministry of Communications and ICT. This cabinet ended its tenure following the death of President John Magufuli.

References

External links
 Government website

John Magufuli
2015 establishments in Tanzania
Cabinets established in 2015